Tennis at the 2007 Pan American Games was played at the Marapendi Club, which has previously hosted Davis Cup ties. Due to the 2007 Davis Cup, the men's competition was delayed one week. The women's events took place from July 18 to 22, while the men competed between July 23 and July 28.

Medal summary

Medal table

External links
Official site

 
Pan American Games
2007 Pan American
2007
Events at the 2007 Pan American Games